The 1908 United States presidential election in Montana took place on November 3, 1908 as part of the 1908 United States presidential election. Voters chose three representatives, or electors to the Electoral College, who voted for president and vice president.

Montana voted for the Republican nominee, Secretary of War William Howard Taft, over the Democratic nominee, former U.S. Representative William Jennings Bryan. Taft won the state by a narrow margin of 4.37%. 

Bryan had previously won Montana by large margins in both 1896 and 1900, defeating William McKinley both times.

Results

Results by county

See also
 United States presidential elections in Montana

References

Montana
1908
1908 Montana elections